The Gover Stream (meaning stream) is an approximately  long stream located in mid south Cornwall, England, United Kingdom.

The stream flows south east through the Gover Valley into the town of St Austell where it joins the St Austell River or "White River". The Gover Stream is the first of the two largest tributaries of the St Austell River.

Rivers in the area have problems with china clay waste materials, mostly kaolinite, entering the rivers and turning them white. This led to the locally named "White River". (Kaolinite is not a waste material of the quarrying process, but economically not all of the kaolin can be extracted). Suspended particles in the stream are reduced by approximately 98% by settling tanks at the beginning of the river. This reduces the energy of the water in the tanks and allows suspended particles to be deposited and later dredged by diggers.

Several disused china clay dries are located along the stream showing its past industrial importance. There were also plans to extend the Pentewan railway along the valley from St Austell, but they did not come to fruition.

Recently the Gover Valley has been under threat due to a plan to use the valley as a tipping site for china clay waste. Waste is a huge problem in the area as for every tonne of kaolinite produced there are on average nine tonnes of waste materials produced; this amounts to approximately 20 million tonnes of waste materials per year. The tip will be landscaped once completed.

References

 BBC news website:
Walk against china clay dump plan
China clay dump plan under fire
 Blueprint for Cornwall 2003 — (Imerys promotional book)

Gover Stream